Angelo Iannuzzelli (born 10 April 1970) is a Salvadoran athlete. He competed in the men's long jump at the 1992 Summer Olympics.

References

1970 births
Living people
Athletes (track and field) at the 1992 Summer Olympics
Salvadoran male long jumpers
Olympic athletes of El Salvador
Place of birth missing (living people)
Central American Games gold medalists for El Salvador
Central American Games medalists in athletics
20th-century Salvadoran people